Institute of Industrial Relations or Institute for Industrial Relations may refer to:
China Institute of Industrial Relations in Beijing
Institute for Industrial Relations of the Haas School of Business at the University of California, Berkeley, now the UC-Berkeley Institute for Research on Labor and Employment
Institute of Industrial Relations of the University of California, Los Angeles, now the UCLA Institute for Research on Labor and Employment
Institute of Industrial Relations of the University of the Philippines Diliman in Quezon City, Metro Manila, now the University of the Philippines School of Labor and Industrial Relations
UIUC Institute of Labor and Industrial Relations of the University of Illinois at Urbana-Champaign